Charles the Good (10842 March 1127) was Count of Flanders from 1119 to 1127. His murder and its aftermath were chronicled by Galbert of Bruges. He was beatified by Pope Leo XIII in 1882 through cultus confirmation.

Early life
Charles was born in Denmark, only son of the three children of King Canute IV (Saint Canute) and Adela of Flanders. His father was assassinated in Odense Cathedral in 1086, and Adela fled back to Flanders, taking the very young Charles with her but leaving her twin daughters Ingeborg and Cecilia in Denmark. Charles grew up at the comital court of his grandfather Robert I of Flanders and uncle Robert II of Flanders. In 1092 Adela went to southern Italy to marry Roger Borsa, duke of Apulia, leaving Charles in Flanders.

Charles travelled to the Holy Land in 1107 or 1108 with a fleet of English, Danes and Flemings.  This is possibly the fleet of Guynemer of Boulogne, described similarly.  He was offered the crown of the Kingdom of Jerusalem but refused for reasons unknown.

Countship of Flanders
In 1111 Robert II died, and Charles's cousin Baldwin VII of Flanders became count. Charles was a close advisor to the new count (who was several years younger), who around 1118 arranged Charles's marriage to the heiress of the count of Amiens, Margaret of Clermont, daughter of Renaud II, Count of Clermont. The childless count Baldwin VII was wounded fighting at the Battle of Bures-en-Brai in September 1118, and he designated Charles as his successor before he died on 17 July 1119.

In 1125 Charles expelled Jews from Flanders, attributing their price gouging as a cause of additional suffering during the famine which afflicted his domains in that year. During the famine, Charles distributed bread to the poor, and took action to prevent grain from being hoarded and sold at excessively high prices. Prodded by his advisors, he also began proceedings to reduce the influential Erembald family, which was heavily engaged in this activity, to the status of serfs. As a result, Fr. Bertulf FitzErembald, provost of the Church of St. Donatian, masterminded a conspiracy to assassinate Charles and his advisors. He was also considered a candidate for the election of King of the Romans after the death of Henry V, but rejected the offer.

Death
On the morning of 2 March 1127, as Charles knelt in prayer in the church of St. Donatian, a group of knights answering to the Erembald family entered the church and hacked him to death with broadswords. The brutal and sacrilegious murder of the popular count provoked widespread public outrage, and he was almost immediately regarded popularly as a martyr and saint, although not formally beatified until 1882. The Erembalds, who had planned and carried out the murder of Charles, were besieged inside the castle of Bruges by the enraged nobles and commoners of Bruges and Ghent. All the conspirators were defeated, captured, and tortured to death. King Louis VI of France, who had supported the uprising against the Erembalds, used his influence to select William Clito as the next count of Flanders.

Notes

References

Sources
 
 
 
 
 
 
 
 
 van Ryckeghem, Willy (2019). The Many Enemies of Charles the Good, PDF on academia.edu.org

External links

 Blessed Charles the Good (Patron Saint Index)
 Bl. Charles the Good (Catholic Online)

Danish beatified people
Belgian beatified people
Charles 1
House of Estridsen
French beatified people
1083 births
1127 deaths
People from Odense
12th-century Roman Catholic martyrs
12th-century venerated Christians
Roman Catholic royal saints
Christians of the First Crusade
12th-century people from the county of Flanders
Beatifications by Pope Leo XIII
Sons of kings